Donald Drake Hogestyn (born September 29, 1953) is an American actor best known for his long running role as John Black on the American soap opera Days of Our Lives.

Early life 
Hogestyn was born in Fort Wayne, Indiana, where he graduated from North Side High School.  He attended the University of South Florida in Tampa on a baseball scholarship, majoring in pre-dentistry. He graduated with a double major in microbiology and applied sciences.  He was then drafted by two professional baseball organizations: the St. Louis Cardinals and the New York Yankees.  Hogestyn signed with the Yankees and played third base for one of their farm teams until he was injured in 1977.

Career
Hogestyn began his acting career by entering a Columbia Pictures talent search that included 75,000 people.  Hogestyn was among the 30 selected, and his first starring role was on the prime time series Seven Brides for Seven Brothers.  After a few minor roles (one as Kort, leader of the Micro Workers in the episode 'Princess Metra' on the 80s television series Otherworld), Hogestyn joined the cast of Days of our Lives in 1986. He initially played a mystery man referred to simply as "The Pawn." However, it was soon revealed The Pawn was the presumed-dead Roman Brady.  Hogestyn quickly became a fan favorite and enjoyed many pairings, the most popular of which was with longtime co-star Deidre Hall.  In 1998, while starring on Days, Shelley Long enlisted Hogestyn to join her for the upcoming series Kelly, Kelly. He was set to star in both until the filming of the pilot episode of Kelly, Kelly conflicted with his schedule on Days, and the role went to Robert Hays.

In 1991, Wayne Northrop agreed to return to Days to reprise his role of Roman. In order to keep both actors on the show, Drake's story was retconned, and his past rewritten.  Despite this change, Hogestyn remained one of the show's most popular actors.  The pairing of John Black and Marlena Evans (Deidre Hall) is one of the show's enduring supercouples.

Drake's John Black character was "killed off" the week of October 15, 2007.  It was rumored the character was officially dead and would not be back, but—true to Days reputation for "killing" many characters off and eventually bringing them back—it turned out that John was not really dead at all, but had been abducted by long-time nemesis Stefano DiMera. As of January 8, 2008, Drake was back on Days of our Lives in the role he created. Confirmed on November 17, 2008, Drake, along with his long-time co-star, Deidre Hall, were let go from Days of our Lives due to budget cuts. Days of Our Lives brought back the characters of John and Marlena starting September 26, 2011.

Personal life
Hogestyn married his childhood sweetheart Victoria.  The couple have four children:  three daughters, Whitney, Alexandra and Rachael; and one son, Ben.

Awards, honors and nominations

Soap Opera Digest awards and nominations:Winner, Hottest Male Star (1994)Winner, Hottest Male Star (1995)
Nominated, Hottest Male Star (1997)
Nominated, Hottest Male Star (1998)
Nominated, Hottest Romance (1998) shared with Deidre Hall
Nominated, Favorite Couple (1999) shared with Deidre HallWinner''', Favorite Couple (2005) shared with Deidre Hall

RolesSeven Brides for Seven Brothers (Brian McFadden - 1982)Otherworld (Kort, Leader of the Micro Workers - 1985)Generation (Jack Breed - 1985)Beverly Hills Cowgirl Blues (Rod - 1985)Days of Our Lives (John Black - 1986–2007, 2008–09, 2011–13, 2014–present)Criminal Minds (Senator Alfred Mayhew - 2018)Hallmark Christmas Tree Lane'' (Benjamin Reilly - 2020)

See also
John Black and Marlena Evans
Supercouple

References

External links

 
 

American Jeet Kune Do practitioners
American male soap opera actors
South Florida Bulls baseball players
Fort Lauderdale Yankees players
1953 births
Living people
Male actors from Indiana
Actors from Fort Wayne, Indiana
Oneonta Yankees players
Broward College alumni